

First round selections

The following are the first round picks in the 1973 Major League Baseball draft.

* Did not sign

Other notable Selections

* Did not sign

Background 
Five dominant players of the late 1970s and 1980s were selected in the June regular phase. Infielder Robin Yount (Milwaukee) and outfielder Dave Winfield (San Diego) were first-rounders, while outfielder Fred Lynn (Boston) was selected in the second round, infielder Eddie Murray (Baltimore) was selected in the third round and starting pitcher Mike Flanagan (Baltimore) was picked in the seventh round.

Winfield stepped off the University of Minnesota campus—where he lettered in three sports—and into the Padres' outfield. He was one of three players from this draft to go directly into the bigs. Highly touted David Clyde was chosen by Texas as the nation's number one pick. He jumped from high school to the majors and won his first game as a Ranger shortly thereafter. But the hard-throwing left-hander developed arm problems and had a short-lived career. Besides Clyde and Winfield, Arizona State's Eddie Bane (Minnesota, 11th overall) went directly to the majors. Other selections of interest included, Jack Clark (San Francisco), who was drafted as a pitcher, and Lee Mazzilli (New York Mets). In the January secondary phase, Dick Ruthven (Philadelphia), Jim Sundberg (Texas) and Donnie Moore (Chicago Cubs), who was drafted as an outfielder, were chosen.

Notes

External links 
Complete draft list from The Baseball Cube database

References 

Draft
Major League Baseball draft